This is a list of Members of Parliament (MPs) elected to the House of Representatives at the 1959 Nepalese legislative election and subsequent by-elections.

This list is arranged by constituency. Krishna Prasad Bhattarai serves as the speaker and Bishweshwar Prasad Koirala served as Prime Minister.

House of Representatives composition

List of MPs elected in the election

By-elections

References

External links 

 संसदीय विवरण पुस्तिका, प्रतिनिधि सभा / महासभा (२०१६ - २०१७) (Parliament Report Booklet, House of Representatives / Senate (1959 - 1960) (in Nepali)

General election
1959 in Nepal
1959-related lists